Ursula St. George  (October 22, 1895 – after 1971), born Ursula Edith Kate Mackarness, was an American actress as a teenager. Later in life, known as U. E. K. Cull, she collected art and ancient Chinese artifacts with her banker husband in London.

Early life 
Ursula Edith Kate Mackarness was born on Staten Island. Her English-born father Charles Mackarness was a grandson of dramatist James Planché and son of novelist Matilda Anne Mackarness; he was a magazine editor, sculptor, and dog breeder. Her mother was an actress, and toured with young Ursula as a chaperone. John Mackarness and George Mackarness, both bishops, were her father's uncles; politician Frederick Coleridge Mackarness and sportsman Charles Coleridge Mackarness were his cousins.

Career 
St. George appeared in The Blue Bird (1911), and was best known in the title role in Rebecca of Sunnybrook Farm, which she performed across the United States and Canada in a Klaw and Erlanger production, 1911 and 1912. She was sixteen years old for much of the run of the show. "Miss St. George holds her audience in the delicious spell of her girlishness and ingenuous beauty," raved a Texas critic. 

She and her husband were art collectors, and had a particularly valuable collection of ancient Chinese artifacts. In 1927, Australian artist James Peter Quinn painted her portrait. In 1972, she donated a pair of ancient Chinese bronze vessels to the British Museum, with enough money to build a case for them. Other Cull collection items were auctioned by Sotheby's in the 1960s, and she sold seven paintings by James Peter Quinn in 1975. Further objects from their collection were bequeathed to the British Museum in 1979.

Personal life  
Ursula Mackarness married London banker Anders Eric Knos Cull in 1913, in London. They had six children and lived at Warfield House in Bracknell, Berkshire. Their daughter Ursula Kennard Cull married Sir George Bellew. The Culls' grandson Eric Brodnax was a member of the equestrian team representing the U.S. Virgin Islands at the 1988 Summer Olympics in Seoul.

Ursula Mackarness Cull was widowed in 1968, and still alive in 1972.

References 

1895 births
People from Staten Island
American stage actresses
British art collectors
Women art collectors
People from Bracknell